"Black or White" is a song by American recording artist Michael Jackson, released by Epic Records on November 11, 1991, as the first single from his eighth studio album, Dangerous (1991). Jackson wrote, composed, and produced it with Bill Bottrell. The song is a fusion of pop rock, dance and hip hop. Epic Records described it as "a rock 'n' roll dance song about racial harmony".

"Black or White" reached number one on the US Billboard Hot 100 on December 7, 1991, making it the fastest US chart topper since the Beatles' "Get Back". It stayed there for a total of seven weeks. Jackson became the first artist to have number one hits on the Billboard Hot 100, in the 1970s, 1980s and 1990s with the song. It is certified 3× Platinum by the Recording Industry Association of America (RIAA). Around the world, "Black or White" hit number one in 20 countries, including the US, the UK, Canada, Mexico, Cuba, Turkey, Zimbabwe, Australia, New Zealand, Belgium, Denmark, Finland, France, Ireland, Israel, Italy, Norway, Spain, Sweden, Switzerland and the Eurochart Hot 100. It was the best-selling single worldwide of 1992.

The music video for "Black or White" premiered on MTV, BET, VH1, and Fox, which gave them their highest Nielsen ratings ever at the time, as well as the BBC's Top of the Pops in the UK on November 14, 1991. The video was directed by John Landis, who previously directed Thriller. It was co-choreographed by Jackson and Vincent Paterson. It premiered simultaneously in 27 countries, with an audience of 500 million viewers, the most ever for a music video.

"Black or White" was honored with the first Billboard No. 1 World Single. The music video of the song appears on the video albums: Dangerous: The Short Films (long version), Video Greatest Hits – HIStory (long version, without graffiti on VHS version but with graffiti on DVD version), Number Ones (short version), and Michael Jackson's Vision (long version without graffiti). In 2003, Q magazine ranked "Black or White" at number 84 in their list of the "1001 Best Songs Ever".

Songwriting and recording
"Black or White" was written and recorded over 18 months starting in early 1989. Michael Jackson hired producer Bill Bottrell to help him craft a new sound, one that would shift his style away from his earlier work with Quincy Jones. Bottrell had already worked with Jackson on Victory (1984) and Bad (1987), the latter collaboration performed at Hayvenhurst, Jackson's estate in Encino, California. Jackson invited Bottrell to join him producing and composing songs at Ocean Way Studios in Los Angeles in late 1988, but none of the material from several weeks of sessions there made it to the album. In early 1989, the project was moved to Westlake Audio in West Hollywood, and one of the first things Jackson did was to hum the main riff of "Black or White" to Bottrell, who interpreted the tune on guitar, using a Kramer American Series electric guitar plugged into a Mesa Boogie amplifier, miked with a Beyerdynamic M 160. Jackson also suggested the song's rhythm with his voice, and Bottrell programmed this rhythm into an E-mu Systems drum machine. Bottrell augmented the pattern with samples from an Emulator III. His Atari computer ran a MIDI editing program by Hybrid Arts; Bottrell and Brad Buxer used the program to tweak the percussion timings to give more of a swing feel. Jackson recorded his main and backing vocals into a Neumann U47 microphone. Bottrell said that throughout the next 18 months of changes to the song, Jackson's initial scratch vocal was left in place, and it appears on the final version.

After two days of work, the song had vocals, drum sounds and electric guitar. Bottrell added an acoustic guitar part using a Gibson LG-2 built in the 1940s; a robust model with a big country sound reminiscent of Gene Vincent's classic rockabilly style. Jackson became busy working on other projects, and "Black or White" languished for a few months. The song was picked up again when Bottrell's part of the album project moved to Record One in Sherman Oaks. Bottrell and Jackson felt that the song had two big gaps in the middle, and they determined to fill them. Jackson wanted a heavy metal guitar to fill one of the gaps, so he sang the part he wanted, including chord arpeggiations, to session player Tim Pierce who performed it on a Les Paul instrument plugged into a Marshall stack. Michael Boddicker added the sound of a high-speed guitar by using a Roland sequencer, assisted by Kevin Gilbert. Bottrell blended two different bass sounds, primarily Bryan Loren playing a Moog keyboard bass, augmented by Terry Jackson playing an electric bass guitar.  (Terry Jackson was unrelated to Michael Jackson. Terry was discovered by Thomas Dolby, and played bass in 1988 on Aliens Ate My Buick, co-produced by Bottrell.) Bottrell replaced some of the E-mu default rhythm samples with live drum samples taken from an Akai machine.

For most of the recording process, Michael Jackson left Bottrell alone to work on various ideas. Bottrell wanted a section of rapping to fill the remaining gap, and he suggested LL Cool J or Heavy D, but these proposals did not work out. Bottrell said he had been trying to get someone to write a rap verse for eight months when he was suddenly inspired to write it himself. He recorded Loren performing the rap, but Loren was not at ease in the role. Bottrell recorded it himself several times, editing one of these takes to use as a demonstration for Jackson. Upon hearing the take, Jackson wanted it for the final version. Bottrell pleaded again that they should get a "real rapper", but Jackson insisted on Bottrell's take.

The final polishing of the song involved Bottrell filling a keyboard with various sampled electric guitar notes, and bringing his friend Jasun Martz to play it, taking advantage of Martz's fresh ears and rock sensibility. For the final mix, Bottrell was frustrated by the Solid State Logic (SSL) mixer at Larrabee Sound Studios, which sounded good on the heavy metal guitar, but made the classic guitars seem "too cold and clinical". He ended up using the Neve mixer at Record One to mix the majority of the song, and the SSL for the rap and heavy metal sections. Original tracks were recorded on two Studer 24-track 2-inch analog tape machines, and a compilation of these was laid down on a Mitsubishi ProDigi 32-track digital audio tape deck.

Composition
The song has elements of dance, hip hop and hard rock music such as Bill Bottrell's guitars and Jackson's vocal style. This song is played in the key of E major, and towards the end is modulated to F major and again to A major, with Jackson's vocal spanning from E3 to E6. Its tempo is measured at 115 BPM.

The song's main riff, played by Bill Bottrell, is often incorrectly attributed to Guns N' Roses guitarist Slash. Slash's guitar playing is actually heard in the skit that precedes the album version of the song and he did play the main riff during  performances of the song.

Release

Promotion
"Black or White" was picked as the first single from the album Dangerous. An alternate version was first heard by Sony executives on a plane trip to Neverland, as the third track of the promotional CD acetate. It began to be promoted on radio stations the first week of November 1991 in New York and Los Angeles. "Black or White" was officially released one week later, on November 5, 1991.

Commercial reception
To prepare the audience for the special occasion of the televised premiere of the "Black or White" video, Epic records released the song (without the accompanying images) to radio stations just two days in advance. In a period of 24 hours, "Black or White", described by the record company as "a rock 'n' roll dance song about racial harmony", had been added to the playlists of 96 percent of 237 of the United States' Top 40 radio stations.

"Black or White" entered the Billboard Hot 100 at number 35. A week later it shot up to number three and in its third week, December 7, 1991, it ascended to number one, making it the fastest chart topper since the Beatles' "Get Back", which also won the Hot 100 in just three weeks in 1969 and also his twelfth number-one entry. It closed the year at number one, and remained at the top of the singles chart into 1992 for a total of seven weeks, making Michael Jackson the first artist to have number one popular hits in the 1970s, 1980s and 1990s. In the UK, the single became the first single by an American to go into the singles chart at number one since 1960, when "It's Now or Never" by Elvis Presley did in the same manner. Around the world, "Black or White" hit number one in 20 countries, including the US, the UK, Canada, Mexico, Cuba, Turkey, Zimbabwe, Australia, New Zealand, Belgium, Denmark, Finland, France, Ireland, Israel, Italy, Norway, Spain, Sweden, Switzerland and the Eurochart Hot 100, number two in Germany and Austria and number three in the Netherlands. Previously, Billie Jean and I Just Can't Stop Loving You had each been number one in 9 countries. The single was certified platinum in the US, selling over one million copies and became the second-best-selling single of the year. As of August 2018 the song further certified two-time platinum for the digital sales.

Critical reception
Reviews of the song were generally favorable. In an retrospective review, Chris Lacy from Albumism stated that it "merges classic rock with soulful crooning in a call for racial unity." Stephen Thomas Erlewine of AllMusic highlighted the song. Upon the release, Larry Flick from Billboard described it as a "surprisingly sparse, but instantly gratifying pop/rocker that reveals his grittiest and most affecting performance in years." He noted further that the guitar appearance by Slash and rap cameo by Bill Bottrell is "purely incidental". Clark and DeVaney from Cashbox stated, "The unmistakeable voice and style are street-hip and slick, with a catchy melody and some untraditional acoustic guitar work. There is just a hint of both George Michael and Prince in the production." David Browne from Entertainment Weekly praised the song, adding, "He still knows how to fashion a hook that will take up permanent residence in your brain (away from its video, Black or White is spare and effortless)." Alan Jones from Music Week named it Pick of the Week, commenting, "A bit of patchwork quilt, and something of a disappointment on first hearing, but ultimately it reveals itself as a killer, adding up to far more than sum of its parts. This will go all the way." A reviewer from People magazine stated that "the simple, spry rock riffs" that power the song is "surprisingly effective". Rolling Stones Alan Light in his Dangerous review, compared the song unfavourably to "Beat It": "Neither this slow-burn solo nor the Stones-derived riff on 'Black or White' offers the catharsis of Eddie Van Halen's blazing break on 'Beat It'". Ted Shaw from The Windsor Star felt the song "is quite remarkable, a nearly perfect pop confection", adding, "It is the best thing Jackson has produced since Thriller. The Pazz & Jop critics' poll ranked "Black or White" at number 19. In 1992, Larry Flick commented on the remixes of the song, "Thanks to deft postproduction by David Cole and Robert Clivillés, the cut kicks a potent groove that nicely complements the original tune's kinetic pop/rock nature."

Remixes
The Clivillés & Cole remixes for "Black or White", released as a promotional single in 1992, also charted on many European countries. In the UK, it reached number 14, and in Ireland, number 11. The promotional single also surprisingly peaked at number 18 in Australia. Despite the favourable European response to this remix, it was never included on a Michael Jackson album or compilation, except on the third disc of the French & UK versions of Jackson's greatest hits album King of Pop.

Music video
The accompanying music video for "Black or White" was directed by John Landis, who previously directed the "Thriller" music video (1983). It was filmed from late September to early October 1991. It was choreographed by Jackson and Vincent Paterson. It contains a Dolby Surround sound mix.

Along with Jackson, the video features Macaulay Culkin, Tess Harper, and George Wendt pictured as a family unit in the opening scene, which the Los Angeles Times criticized as "almost exactly a replay" of the 1984 Twisted Sister video for "We're Not Gonna Take It". The dance scene with the Native Americans shown in the video was filmed at Vasquez Rocks Natural Area Park in Agua Dulce, California. The Native American dancers were organized by Jackson's schoolfriend Joanelle Romero, founder of the Red Nation International Film Festival, featuring her daughter Sage as child dancer. The Native American dancers used their own traditional wardrobe and became the first Native Americans in a non-Native American music video. The production enabled Romero to become an established producer. The scene where Michael Jackson and a dancer appear on the freeway was filmed at 11779 Sheldon Street in Sun Valley, Los Angeles. This morphing effect had previously been used only in films such as Willow and Terminator 2: Judgment Day. The morphing visual effects were created by Pacific Data Images.

The video premiered simultaneously in 27 countries, with an audience of 500 million viewers, the most ever for a music video. It premiered on MTV, BET, VH1, and Fox (giving them their highest Nielsen ratings ever at the time) as well as the BBC's Top of the Pops in the UK on November 14, 1991.

Synopsis
The video begins with a boy (Macaulay Culkin) dancing to rock music in his bedroom. His father (George Wendt) yells at him to stop. The boy retaliates by playing an electric guitar loudly enough to fire his father into space, to finally landing in Africa.

Jackson performs "Black or White" with dancers from different cultures, including African Zulu hunters, traditional Thai dancers, Plains Native Americans, a Sri Lankan Tamil Odissi dancer and Hopak dancers. Jackson walks defiantly through visual collages of fire (declaring "I ain't scared of no sheets; I ain't scared of nobody"), referring to KKK torch ceremonies. Culkin and other children (including Michael's niece Brandi; Wade Robson; and Mark Pugh and David Shelton of Another Bad Creation) perform the rap sequence. The group states, "I'm not gonna spend my life being a color." Jackson performs atop the Statue of Liberty, surrounded by other world landmarks. At the end of the video, people of different ethnicities and nationalities dance and morph into one another. A young Tyra Banks can be seen in this sequence.

In the extended version of the music video, after the song, a black panther walks out of the studio into an urban street and transforms into Jackson, who dances furiously and destroys a glass beer bottle, a building window, and a parked car. He tears off his shirt and screams with grand drama as the hotel neon sign falls. After his damage and rampage, he re-emerges as a panther. Finally, Bart Simpson from The Simpsons jams to the song while watching it on the TV. Homer yells at him to "Turn off that noise!" Bart replies, "Chill out, Homeboy." Then, Homer angrily turns the TV off. The static then cuts to a close-up of Jackson with the tagline "prejudice is ignorance".

Controversy and censorship
Controversy was generated concerning the last four minutes of the original music video. A black panther walks out of the studio and then morphs into Jackson. Then he walks outside to perform some of his most physically slick dance moves, in a similar way to "Billie Jean". This part contained sexually suggestive scenes when Jackson starts to grab his crotch, and then zips his pants up. In the original version, Jackson is seen smashing windows, destroying a car with his arm and a crowbar, destroying windows with a steering wheel and a trash can, and causing an inn (called the "Royal Arms Hotel") to explode.

Jackson was sharply criticized for the final scene, especially by Entertainment Weekly which ran a featured article titled "Michael Jackson's Video Nightmare". Jackson asked his fans for forgiveness, saying that the violent and suggestive behavior had been a dance-style interpretation of the animalistic instincts of a panther. Jackson ordered the removal of the video's final scenes from subsequent broadcast. In 2001, Jackson re-issued the video with the final scenes restored in a digitally altered form: the glass windows smashed are now marred with racist and anti-Semitic graffiti displaying epithets like "Nigger" (styled as NI66eR 6O HOMe) and "Wetbacks", as well as a message reading "Hitler Lives" and a storefront door spray-painted with "KKK Rules", referring to the Ku Klux Klan. These alterations gave a new reasoning to Jackson's destruction of property.

Track listings

 7-inch (UK)
Side one
 "Black or White" (Single Version) – 3:22
Side two
 "Black or White" (Instrumental) – 3:22

 7-inch (US)
Side one
 "Black or White" (Single Version) – 3:22
Side two
 "Black or White" (Instrumental) – 3:22

 12-inch (UK)
Side one
 "Black or White" - 3:22
 "Bad" - 4:04
Side two
 "Black or White (Instrumental)" - 3:22
 "Thriller" - 5:57

 12-inch (The Clivillés & Cole Remixes) (UK)
Side one
 "Black or White" (The Clivillés & Cole House / Club Mix) – 7:36
 "Black or White" (The Clivillés & Cole House / Dub Mix) – 6:34
Side two
 "Black or White" (The Underground Club Mix) – 7:29
 "Black or White" (House With Guitar Radio Mix) – 3:53
 "Black or White" (Tribal Beats) – 3:38

 Limited Edition 12-inch (US)
Side one
 "Black or White" (The Clivilles & Cole House/Club Mix) – 7:33
 "Black or White" (The Clivilles & Cole House/Dub Mix) – 6:27

Side two
 "Black or White" (House with Guitar Radio Mix) – 3:53
 "Black or White" (Single Version) – 3:22
 "Black or White" (Instrumental) – 3:22
 "Black or White" (Tribal Beats) – 3:34

 CD (UK)
 "Black or White" (single version) – 3:22
 "Black or White" (instrumental) – 3:22
 "Smooth Criminal" – 4:16

 CD (The Clivillés & Cole Remixes) (UK)
 "Black or White" (The Clivillés & Cole House / Club Mix) – 7:36
 "Black or White" (The Clivillés & Cole House / Dub Mix) – 6:34
 "Black or White" (The Underground Club Mix) – 7:29
 "Black or White" (House With Guitar Radio Mix) – 3:53
 "Black or White" (Tribal Beats) – 3:38

 CD (US)
 "Black or White" (Single Version) – 3:22
 "Black or White" (Instrumental) – 3:22

 Promo VHS (UK) (PAL)
 "Black or White" (Domestic Version) (Music Video) - 11:00

Visionary
 CD side
 "Black or White" (Single Version) – 3:22
 "Black or White" (Clivillés & Cole House Guitar Radio Mix) – 3:53
 DVD side
 "Black or White" (Music Video) – 11:00
 "Black or White" (Single Version) – 3:22
 "Black or White" (Clivillés & Cole House Guitar Radio Mix) – 3:53

Cultural impact
In 1991, "Weird Al" Yankovic recorded a parody of "Black or White" titled "Snack All Night", which was never released. Although Jackson was a long-time supporter of Yankovic's work and had approved past parodies, he told Yankovic that he was reluctant to approve a parody of "Black or White" because of the message of the song. Yankovic believes that Jackson's rejection of the parody was ultimately for the best, because he was unsatisfied with the quality of the song and its scrapping left room on his next album for "Smells Like Nirvana", one of his biggest hits. As with other rejected parodies, Yankovic has performed "Snack All Night" during his concerts.

The music video, particularly the panther segment, have been referenced or parodied by television shows and artists, notably by Saturday Night Live and In Living Color. Comedian Chris Rock joked that he was angry because Jackson had smashed his car. In 1991, English rock band Genesis parodied the "Black or White" video in the ending of their video for "I Can't Dance", in which member Phil Collins imitates Michael Jackson's "panther" fit in front of a stark white background. In 2012, the television show Glee covered the song in the episode "Michael", it features primary voices from Kevin McHale, Lea Michele, Chris Colfer, Amber Riley and Naya Rivera, and backing vocals from the rest of the cast. Jenna Ushkowitz and Darren Criss are not featured in the song or the performance. This cover debuted and peaked at number 64 on the Billboard Hot 100, number 42 at Billboard Digital Songs, and number 69 at Billboard Canadian Hot 100 chart at the week of February 18, 2012.

Charts

Weekly charts

Year-end charts

Decade-end charts

Certifications

Personnel
 Michael Jackson – vocals, composition, lyrics, production
 Bill Bottrell – rap vocals and lyrics, engineering, mixing, production, electric and acoustic guitars, drum programming, keyboard programming
 Brad Buxer – drum programming
 Bryan Loren – Moog bass
 Terry Jackson – electric bass guitar
 Brad Buxer – keyboards
 Jasun Martz – keyboards
 Tim Pierce – heavy metal guitar
 Michael Boddicker, Kevin Gilbert: speed sequencer
 Teddy Riley: drum programming (cowbell)

References

1991 singles
Songs written by Michael Jackson
Michael Jackson songs
American hard rock songs
Billboard Hot 100 number-one singles
Cashbox number-one singles
European Hot 100 Singles number-one singles
Irish Singles Chart number-one singles
Number-one singles in Australia
Number-one singles in Austria
Number-one singles in Denmark
Number-one singles in Finland
SNEP Top Singles number-one singles
Number-one singles in Greece
Number-one singles in Israel
Music videos directed by John Landis
Number-one singles in Italy
Number-one singles in New Zealand
Number-one singles in Norway
Number-one singles in Poland
Number-one singles in Spain
Number-one singles in Sweden
Number-one singles in Switzerland
Number-one singles in Turkey
Number-one singles in Zimbabwe
Protest songs
Songs against racism and xenophobia
RPM Top Singles number-one singles
Ultratop 50 Singles (Flanders) number-one singles
UK Singles Chart number-one singles
Song recordings produced by Michael Jackson
Songs written by Bill Bottrell
Song recordings produced by Bill Bottrell
1991 songs
Epic Records singles
Music video controversies